Line 10 (Polígon Pratenc – Gorg) is the name of one of the two branches of the Barcelona metro line 9, currently (2020) under construction and to be operated by TMB. Like Line 9 and Line 11, it will be an automatic train operation (i.e. driverless vehicle) metro line.

Overview

The line will link the Zona Franca with Badalona, through Barcelona proper, sharing most of the area covered by L9. L9/10 will be the deepest and longest line in the network. Originally expected to be ready by 2008, ongoing problems with its construction are going to delay its completion until as late as 2025.

The line is currently operated in two sections, North and South, similarly to line 9.

Northern section
The section from Gorg to Bon Pastor opened on 18 April 2010, and the section from La Sagrera to Bon Pastor (except Sagrera | TAV station) opened 26 June 2010. This section is operated as L10 Nord.

Southern section
On 8 September 2018 the section between Foc station and the junction with the main route of line 9 at Can Tries Gornal opened to the public, with the exception of the stations Ciutat de la Justícia and Provençana. The opening of these two stations was deferred to 2019, with the rest of the line on the viaduct through the Zona Franca proper opening between 2020 and 2025. Trains on this section operate between Zona Franca and Collblanc stations, as the line from Collblanc to Zona Universitària is single track and does not have sufficient capacity for both L9 and L10 to run. This section is operated as L10 Sud.

Provençana station opened to the public on 2 March 2019 followed by Ciutat de la Justícia on 24 November 2019. The section between Foc and Zona Franca, with the exception of the Motors station, opened on 1 February 2020. On 7 November 2021, the section from Zona Franca to ZAL - Riu Vell opened to the public.

List of stations
(Stations under construction in italics)

Zona Franca area
 Pratenc
Provisional L10 Sud Start
 ZAL Riu Vell
 Ecoparc
 Port Comercial La Factoria
 Zona Franca
 Motors
 Foc (future connection with L2)
 Foneria
 Ciutat de la Justícia (L8)
 Provençana
Central branch, shared with L9
 Can Tries Gornal
 Torrassa (L1, RENFE)
 Collblanc (L5)
Provisional L10 Sud End
 Camp Nou (T1, T2, T3 via Avinguda de Xile)
 Zona Universitària (L3) (T1, T2, T3)
 Campus Nord
 Manuel Girona
 Prat de la Riba
 Sarrià (L6, L12)
 Mandri
 El Putxet (L7)
 Lesseps (L3)
 Muntanya
 Sanllehy
 Guinardó Hospital de Sant Pau (L4)
 Plaça de Maragall
Provisional L10 Nord Start
 La Sagrera (L1, L5, RENFE, future L4)
 Sagrera TAV (future connections with L4, RENFE-AVE)
 Onze de Setembre
 Bon Pastor
Besòs area
 Llefià
 La Salut
 Gorg (L2, T5, T6)
Provisional L10 Nord End

References

External links
 Avui article, part 1
 Avui article, part 2

10
Transport in Badalona
Transport in Sant Andreu
2010 establishments in Spain